Lionel Pérez (born 24 April 1967) is a French former professional footballer who played as a goalkeeper. More recently, he was a goalkeeping coach at Stevenage Borough, following his retirement from the game in 2004.

Playing career

France
Pérez was born in Bagnols-sur-Cèze, Gard. His football career started with French club, Bordeaux. However, much of this time was spent out on loan with Nîmes Olympique then Stade Lavallois.

Sunderland
Pérez made his Sunderland debut, aged 29 on 19 October 1996, as a substitute for Tony Coton, in a 3–0 away defeat against Southampton. He stayed with Sunderland for a further two years, before signing for rivals Newcastle United, in what was a surprise move at the time.

Newcastle United
At Newcastle United, Pérez was fourth-choice behind Steve Harper, Shay Given and John Karelse; he never made a competitive start for the Magpies and after being loaned to various clubs throughout his 21-month spell on Tyneside, he was granted a free transfer to Cambridge United in July 2000, reportedly taking a 95% pay cut to do so.

Later career
Pérez was released by Cambridge at the end of the 2002–03 season, before joining Enfield in October 2002, and then Stevenage Borough in February 2003, after a short stint at Chelmsford City. He was a regular for Stevenage until in March 2004 (being voted Player of the Year), he broke his leg playing in a league match against Barnet. Pérez was forced to retire at the end of the season, and he immediately took up a coaching role at the club. Pérez left his coaching role at the club in April 2006.

Coaching career
On leaving Stevenage, Perez and his family moved back to France where he had spells coaching at FC PHA Chusclan Laudun and SO Cassis Carnoux. He has been inactive in football since 2010. He is currently looking to get back into football, having gained his UEFA B licence.

References

External links
 
 

1967 births
Living people
People from Bagnols-sur-Cèze
French people of Spanish descent
Sportspeople from Gard
French footballers
Footballers from Occitania (administrative region)
Association football goalkeepers
Ligue 1 players
Ligue 2 players
Premier League players
English Football League players
Newcastle United F.C. players
Cambridge United F.C. players
Sunderland A.F.C. players
Scunthorpe United F.C. players
Stevenage F.C. players
FC Girondins de Bordeaux players
Enfield F.C. players
Chelmsford City F.C. players
Nîmes Olympique players
Stade Lavallois players
French expatriate footballers
French expatriate sportspeople in England
Expatriate footballers in England